Sergio Germán Romero (born 22 February 1987) is an Argentine professional footballer who plays as a goalkeeper for Boca Juniors. He has also played for the Argentina national team.

Romero made his debut with Racing Club in the Argentine Primera División in 2007 and then transferred to Dutch club AZ Alkmaar at the end of the season. He won the Eredivisie in 2009 and two years later joined Italian side Sampdoria. In 2013, he joined Monaco on a season-long loan. He joined Manchester United in July 2015 and left the club after six seasons.

Romero is the most capped goalkeeper in the history of the Argentina national team, playing over 90 times since his debut in 2009. He has represented Argentina at two World Cups and at three Copa América tournaments, finishing as runner-up in the 2014 FIFA World Cup, as well as in the 2015 and 2016 Copa América tournaments. He also was part of the team that won gold at the 2008 Olympics.

Club career

Racing Club
Born in Bernardo de Irigoyen, Argentina, Romero began his youth career at Almirante Brown and CAI before joining Racing Club.

Romero passed from the youth to the first team of -Racing Club in 2006, making his debut in the Argentine Primera División. Romero appeared in the substitute bench throughout the 2005 season. Throughout the 2006 season, he continued to be in the substitute bench. Despite this, he signed his first professional contract with the club.

In the 2007 season, Romero found himself competing the first-choice goalkeeper role with José Luis Martínez Gullotta. Romero made his Racing Club debut of Matchday 1 of Torneo Apertura, in a 1–1 draw against Nueva Chicago. However, in the following match, Romero lost his first-choice goalkeeper role to Gustavo Campagnuolo and spent two months on the sidelines. Weeks after signing for AZ when he moved in the summer, Romero made his first appearance in two months on 14 April 2007 against Colón, in a 1–1 draw; followed up by another appearance on 22 April 2007, in a 3–3 draw against Belgrano. After Campagnuolo suffered an injury, Romero made his last appearance for the club on 17 June 2007, in a 4–2 win over Godoy Cruz.

AZ Alkmaar

2007–08 season 

It was announced on 24 March 2007 that Romero signed for AZ Alkmaar, who were managed by Louis van Gaal when he joined the club on 1 July. There, Romero was expected to fight for the first-choice goalkeeper role with Boy Waterman.

After an injury to Waterman, Romero made his Eredivisie debut on 30 September 2007 against Heracles Almelo, during which he conceded a penalty, and AZ lost 2–1. In his second match of the season against Twente on 23 February 2008 he kept his first clean sheet for the side, in a 0–0 draw. From that moment on, Romero became a regular in the team, with AZ finishing 11th.

2008–09 season 
In 2008–09, Romero established himself as first-choice goalkeeper at AZ following the departure of Waterman to Den Haag. Romero kept a 950-minute clean sheet for AZ from November 2008 to February 2009. While keeping a clean sheet Romero signed a new contract with the club, keeping him there until 2012. On 5 March 2009 in the quarterfinals of the KNVB Cup he made a mistake which allowed Breda's Nourdin Boukhari to score, as AZ were beaten 2–1. After the defeat, he broke the bones in his hand by punching the door and walls of his team's changing room in frustration, an injury which ruled him out of the team at a crucial stage of the season. While on the side-lines, AZ won the Eredivisie in the 2008–09 season. He returned on 26 April 2009 after Joey Didulica was injured in a clash with Luis Suárez, playing 16 minutes of a 1–1 draw against Ajax. Romero ended the 2008–09 season having made 31 appearances in all competitions.

2009–10 season 
The 2009–10 season marked the departure of Van Gaal to Bayern Munich. Romero was linked with a move away from AZ, with Juventus and Bayern Munich keen on signing him, but stayed at the club throughout the summer. Romero started the season well in the Johan Cruyff Shield, when he helped AZ win 5–1 against Heerenveen to win the title. Continuing to be first-choice goalkeeper, Romero made his UEFA Champions League debut on Matchday 1 of the Group Stage in a 0–1 loss against Olympiacos. However, a week later, he suffered a knee injury that side-lined him for a week. A week later on 3 October 2009 he returned to the first team from injury in a 1–0 win over Breda. Later in the season Romero suffered a further injury which caused him to be substituted in the first half of a 1–0 win over Sparta Rotterdam on 21 March 2010. It was announced that this injury would rule Romero out for the remainder of the season, putting his place in the 2010 World Cup in doubt. Despite his injuries, by the end of the 2009–10 season Romero had made 36 appearances in all competitions.

2010–11 season 
Romero missed the start of the season the 2010–11 season, due to international commitment and injury, eventually making his first appearance of the season on 19 September 2010 in a 1–0 win over NEC. Eleven days later, on 30 September 2010, Romero made his UEFA Europa League debut in a 1–4 loss against BATE Borisov in the Group Stage. By February, Romero was out of the first team for the second time that season, due to international commitment and ankle injury. After spending a month on the side-lines, Romero returned to the first team on 2 April 2011 in a 1–0 win over Feyenoord. At the end of the 2010–11 season, Romero had made 31 appearances in all competitions, helping AZ to 4th place in the league and qualification into the Europa League.

At the start of the 2011–12 season Romero was criticised by manager Gertjan Verbeek for his unprofessional attitude, having failed to return to the club following the conclusion of 2011 Copa América. As a result, Romero was dropped from the AZ squad until the transfer window finished. He later joined Sampdoria on 22 August 2011.

Sampdoria

2011–12 season 

On 22 August 2011, Romero was signed for €2.1 million on a 4-year contract by Sampdoria, which had been relegated the previous season to Serie B. Upon joining the club, Romero said his aim is to help the club reach promotion to Serie A.

Romero made his debut four days later at home against Padova in the opening match of the season, in a 2–2 draw. Despite being a first team regular, Romero missed several matches by the first half of the season due to international commitment as well as injury and suspension. Romero managed to regain his first choice goalkeeper role until he suffered injuries around April. The season ended with Sampdoria in sixth place, and after victories over Sassuolo and Varese 1910 in the playoffs, which he played once, due to his own international commitment, they earned promotion to Serie A. In his first season at Sampdoria, Romero finished his first season, making 30 appearances in all competitions.

2012–13 season 
In his second season at Sampdoria, Romero continued to remain a first choice goalkeeper this season following the injury of second choice goalkeeper, Angelo da Costa Júnior. Romero then made his Serie A debut, in the opening match of the season, where he kept a clean sheet, in a 1–0 win over A.C. Milan. However, in a match against Parma on 21 October 2012, Romero was sent-off in the 34th minute for conceding a penalty, in a 1–2 loss. At the end of the 2012–13 season, Romero went on to make 33 appearances in all competitions despite appearing on the substitute for the last three remaining league matches amid to rumors of leaving the club. However, this was denied by Romero, who stated that he is committed to stay at the club.

2013–14 season: Loan to Monaco 

For the 2013–14 season, Romero was loaned to Monaco of Ligue 1. Romero later reflected his move to Monaco, stating that he doesn't regret his choices. Romero made his Monaco debut, in the third round of Coupe da La League, in a 0–1 loss against Stade de Reims on 30 October 2013. It wasn't until on 12 April 2014 when he made his league debut, in a 1–0 win over Rennes. Second choice behind Danijel Subašić, he played three league matches as the team finished as runners-up to Paris Saint-Germain, but was first choice in the cup competitions, playing six times.

2014–15 season 
After his return to Sampdoria, he was most often the backup to Emiliano Viviano. But following Viviano's injury, Romero had an opportunity when he made his first appearance on 19 October 2014, in a 2–2 draw against Cagliari. Romero had a handful of first team opportunities playing throughout 2014 until Viviano return in early 2015. In the January transfer window, Romero's lack of first team opportunities, prompted him to leave the club in January, but this never happened. From that moment on, Romero returned as a second choice goalkeeper and never played again, as he appeared on the substitute bench, as well as, injury. At the end of the 2014–15 season, Romero went on to make eleven appearances in all competitions.

Following this, Romero was released by the club at the end of the 2014–15 season when his contract came to an end, which he confirmed his release on 6 June 2015. It came after when the club allowed Romero to leave the club at the end of the season.

Manchester United

2015–16 season 

On 27 July 2015, Manchester United completed the signing of Romero on a free transfer. He penned a three-year contract, with the option to extend for a further year, and reunited with his former AZ manager Louis van Gaal. Upon joining the club, Romero was given the number 20 shirt, saying: "There was a misunderstanding between myself and the manager, Van Gaal. He asked me what squad number I wanted, and I said 22. But he must have thought I'd said 21 because he told me if I wanted that number, I would have to go and speak with Ander Herrera. Anyway, it turned out Nick Powell had recently changed to 22, so I just said that no.20 would do fine."

With David de Gea withdrawn from the squad amidst transfer speculation, and Víctor Valdés out of favour with manager Van Gaal, Romero made his Premier League debut on 8 August 2015 as the season opened with a 1–0 victory against Tottenham Hotspur at Old Trafford. His distribution was described as "nervy" but produced two crucial saves that helped United win the match. He did not concede in his first three league matches for United. After de Gea failed to leave the club in the summer he returned to the first team, which resulted in Romero becoming the second choice goalkeeper. Despite this, Romero was first choice in cup competitions.

2016–17 season 

In his second season at Manchester United, Romero continued to be the first choice goalkeeper in cup competitions, including the club's Europa League campaign, which new manager José Mourinho explained that he deserved to play in. Romero kept his first clean sheet of the season on 29 September 2016, in a 1–0 win over Zorya Luhansk. Romero's performance in a 4–0 win over Feyenoord was praised by pundits. Following this, Romero kept three more clean sheets in the UEFA Europa League matches, in which he kept two in both legs against Saint-Étienne. In the second leg of a match against Rostov, Romero made a crucial save from Christian Noboa’s free-kick, which helped Manchester United progress to the next round. Romero rejected a move back to his homeland with Boca Juniors in the January transfer window. Romero played in the 2017 Europa League final in which he kept a clean sheet in a 2–0 victory over Ajax.

2017–18 season
On 16 July 2017, Romero was reported to have signed contract extension with the Manchester United until 2021.

2019–20 season

On 12 December 2019, during his 50th appearance for the club, he kept a clean sheet in a 4–0 victory over his former club AZ during a Europa League group stage match, bringing his total number of clean sheets to 31 in 50 matches, equating to 62% of his games for the club.

2020–21 season

After not featuring for the whole of the 2020–21 season, on 4 June 2021, Romero was set to become a free agent due to the expiration of his contract, after Manchester United releasing a list of players who were being released at the end of June. Throughout his 6 seasons with the club, mostly playing as the second fiddle to De Gea, and mainly as the goalkeeper for the cup matches, he played 61 matches in all competitions and kept 39 clean sheets.

Venezia 
On 11 October 2021, Venezia signed Romero on a free transfer.

Boca Juniors 
On 8 August 2022, Romero returned to Argentina after 15 years playing in Europe, and signed a two-and-a-half-year contract with Boca Juniors.

International career

Youth career
Romero represented Argentina at the 2007 South American Youth Championship in Paraguay and at the 2007 FIFA U-20 World Cup in Canada where on 8 August 2007 Romero was first included in the Argentine selection for a friendly match against Norway and against Australia, which Argentina also went on to win.

After being called up by Sergio Batista for the Olympics, He replaced injured Oscar Ustari at the 2008 Summer Olympics football tournament. Prior to that, Romero played in the 2006 Toulon Tournament, where they were eliminated in the Group Stage.

Senior career

Romero was called up to the full senior side by then coach Diego Maradona debuting on 9 September 2009 in a 0–1 2010 FIFA World Cup qualifying loss against Paraguay and playing in the win against Uruguay in Montevideo that saw Argentina qualify for the 2010 FIFA World Cup. He played in all five of Argentina's World Cup matches which ended in the quarter-final defeat, during which Romero found himself competing for the first choice goalkeeper role with Juan Pablo Carrizo.

Prior to the 2010 FIFA World Cup, Romero's place in the World Cup was in doubt as result of suffering an injury, whilst at AZ. But Romero managed recover from injury and was included in the squad. Romero played his first World Cup match in the Group Stage against Nigeria, where he kept a clean sheet, in a 1–0 victory. Romero continued to remain the first choice goalkeeper throughout the World Cup campaign until their elimination in a 0–4 loss against Germany.

Romero was part of Sergio Batista's Copa América squad in which Argentina, the hosts, lost to eventual winners Uruguay on penalties in the quarter-finals. During the tournament, Romero kept two clean sheets against Colombia and Costa Rica. He retained his position as number one choice under new coach Alejandro Sabella for the ongoing 2014 FIFA World Cup qualifiers.

 
Romero was Argentina's starting goalkeeper at the 2014 FIFA World Cup despite lack of first team opportunities whilst at Monaco. In the semi-final, he earned himself Man of the Match by saving kicks from Ron Vlaar and Wesley Sneijder as Argentina defeated the Netherlands 4–2 in a penalty shoot-out to reach the 2014 FIFA World Cup Final on 13 July, where they lost 0–1 to Germany. On 11 July 2014, Romero was named on the three-man shortlist for FIFA's Golden Glove award for the tournament's best goalkeeper due to his performances that led his team to the final.

At the 2015 Copa América, Romero saved from Juan Camilo Zúñiga in the penalty shoot-out at the end of Argentina's goalless quarter-final against Colombia in Viña del Mar; although three takers did not score their penalties, this was the only save.

On 21 May 2018, Romero was named in Argentina's squad for the 2018 FIFA World Cup in Russia by manager Jorge Sampaoli, but was later ruled out of the tournament due to a knee injury suffered the day after the announcement.

Personal life

He is married to fellow Argentine Eliana Guercio, they have 4 children together.

Career statistics

Club

International

Honours
AZ Alkmaar
Eredivisie: 2008–09
Johan Cruyff Shield: 2009

Manchester United
FA Cup: 2015–16
EFL Cup: 2016–17
FA Community Shield: 2016
UEFA Europa League: 2016–17
UEFA Super Cup runner-up: 2017

Boca Juniors
Primera División: 2022
Supercopa Argentina: 2022

Argentina U20
FIFA U-20 World Cup: 2007

Argentina Olympic
Olympic football gold medal: 2008

Argentina
FIFA World Cup runner-up: 2014
Copa América runner-up: 2015, 2016
Individual
UEFA Europa League Squad of the Season: 2016–17

References

External links

 Player Profile - Manchester United Official Website
 Argentine Primera statistics at Fútbol XXI 
 
 Official website 
 Lega Serie A profile 
 

1987 births
Living people
Sportspeople from Misiones Province
Argentine footballers
Association football goalkeepers
Comisión de Actividades Infantiles footballers
Racing Club de Avellaneda footballers
AZ Alkmaar players
U.C. Sampdoria players
AS Monaco FC players
Manchester United F.C. players
Venezia F.C. players
Boca Juniors footballers
Argentine Primera División players
Eredivisie players
Serie A players
Serie B players
Ligue 1 players
Premier League players
UEFA Europa League winning players
Olympic footballers of Argentina
Argentina under-20 international footballers
Argentina international footballers
Footballers at the 2008 Summer Olympics
2010 FIFA World Cup players
2011 Copa América players
2014 FIFA World Cup players
2015 Copa América players
Copa América Centenario players
Olympic gold medalists for Argentina
Olympic medalists in football
Medalists at the 2008 Summer Olympics
Argentine expatriate footballers
Argentine expatriate sportspeople in the Netherlands
Argentine expatriate sportspeople in Italy
Argentine expatriate sportspeople in Monaco
Argentine expatriate sportspeople in England
Expatriate footballers in the Netherlands
Expatriate footballers in Italy
Expatriate footballers in Monaco
Expatriate footballers in England